"In the Zone" is a song by Puerto Rican recording artist Ivy Queen featuring Haitian rapper Wyclef Jean. It was composed by Queen, Jean, Deborah Castillero, Aaron King and Omar Navarro and released on February 9, 1999, as the lead single from her second studio album The Original Rude Girl (1998). The song is a hip hop track.

The collaboration with Wyclef Jean helped elevate Ivy Queen's status and expose her to American audiences. An accompanying music video was also shot and released. It was directed by Jeff Kennedy and produced by George Barnes. A remix version was also recorded and included on the album featuring extra verses from both Queen and Jean. The song managed to chart at number 38 on the Billboard Rhythmic Top 40.

Background
In 1998, while Wyclef Jean was touring Puerto Rico, Ivy Queen attended one of his concerts. Wyclef then sent an invitation for fans to come up on stage if they thought they could flow. With encouragement from friends, Queen gained the courage to step up on stage and do her thing. Needless to say her singing and rapping ability amazed Wyclef enough that later they collaborated on a track in the studio, thus "In The Zone" was born.

Composition

"In The Zone" was written by Ivy Queen, Wyclef Jean, Omar Navarro, known artistically as Gran Omar, Deborah Castillero and Aaron King. Gran Omar was Queen's then-husband at the time. The song was recorded at The Hit Factory in New York City. It is a hip hop song, which is a departure from the musical styles of reggaeton featured on her debut effort. Queen's verses are sung in Spanish, and Jean's verses are sung in English. However, Queen can be heard speaking English as well such as in the chorus where Jean says "Ayo, where you from Ivy Queen" where she replies with "Puerto Rico, one time". The official release features five tracks. The first is a dance remix of the song while the second is the Album version. The third track is a salsa version produced by DJ Nelson. A hip hop remix by King Saphreem is track number four while the a cappella is track five. According to Patricia Meschino of the Miami New Times the song was a solid collaboration with Jean which introduced her to a new audience.

Release and promotion
Following the album's fourth quarter release on December 15, 1998, Ivy Queen embarked on a tour shortly after throughout Puerto Rico and the United States. The song was released February 9, 1999. An accompanying music video was also shot and released. It was directed by Jeff Kennedy and produced by George Barnes. A second music video was filmed and directed by Gabriel Goldberg. A remix version was also recorded and included on the album featuring extra verses from both Queen and Jean. A second single, "Ritmo Latino" featuring Victor Vargas and WepaMan was also released in 1999.

The album was reissued by Sony Discos on August 25, 1999 with an alternate remix of "In The Zone" as the closing track. In August 1998, she performed at Disney Beach Club Resort along with other artists from the Sony Discos label over the course of three days. She appeared at the 1999 Latin Alternative Music Conference before she became famous and was questioned as to why she was there. The founder, Thomas Cookman responded in her defense with "because she's valid".

Track listing
 CD Single

Credits and personnel
Credits adapted from single's liner notes
Track One — Brother's Radio Mix 
Produced and mixed by: Luis Diaz and Hugo Boss for Diaz Bros. Productions.
Recorded and mixed at: Extreme Music Studios, Miami, Florida

Track Two — Original Flow Mix
Produced by: DJ Nelson for Flow Music.
Musical Director: Omar Navarro
Engineered and mixed by: Andy Grassi
Recorded and mixed at: The Hit Factory, New York, New York
A&R by: Deborah Castillero

Track Three — DJ Sahpreem King Mix
Produced by: Sahpreem King for Sewer Ratz Productions, Inc. / Perpetual Nod Recordings, Inc. 
Additional production by: Dr. Paul for Chain Gain Productions Inc.

Track Four — Latineez Version
Produced and mixed by: DJ Nelson for Flow Music Productions
Congas and guitar by: Georgie Salgado
Additional percussion and bass by: N. Diaz

Charts

References

External links
 In The Zone - Music Video

1998 songs
1999 singles
Hip hop songs
Ivy Queen songs
Wyclef Jean songs
Jason Nevins songs
Spanish-language songs
Songs written by Ivy Queen
Songs written by Wyclef Jean
Songs written by Gran Omar
Macaronic songs
Spanglish songs
Salsa songs
House music songs
Sony Discos singles